Kaunas Reservoir (Kaunas Lagoon, Kaunas Sea) is the largest Lithuanian artificial lake, created in 1959 by damming the Nemunas River near Kaunas and Rumšiškės. It occupies 63.5 square kilometers, which is about 0.1% of the total territory of Lithuania. The reservoir supports the operations of the Kaunas Hydroelectric Power Plant. Its waters cover the Nemunas valley from the river's confluence with Strėva River to the dam, a distance of about 25 kilometers. The greatest width of the reservoir is 3.3 kilometers and its greatest depth is 22 meters.

The reservoir also supports the operations of 900MW Kruonis Pumped Storage Plant, which is situated near confluence with Strėva River.

In 1992, in order to protect the local environment and cultural heritage, Kaunas Reservoir Regional Park was established. A yacht club operates in the park.

Gallery

Sites flooded by the Kaunas Reservoir
In anticipation of the reservoir's creation, 721 farms and villages were moved to various locations.

| width="50%" align="left" valign="top" style="border:0"|

 moved southeast

Gastilonys, depopulated

| width="50%" align="left" valign="top" style="border:0"|

, the northern part was flooded, while the southern part was joined to the  village

Pažaislis
 moved south

Rumšiškės; the entire town was relocated 2km northeast to location of the former villages  and 
, a 1st millennium archaeological site

References 

Reservoir
Reservoirs in Lithuania
Reservoirs built in the Soviet Union
RKaunas